Olof Björn Dreijer (born 27 November 1981) is a Swedish DJ and record producer, best known as one half of the electronic music duo the Knife, formed with his sibling Karin Dreijer.

Although the Knife very rarely performed live concerts, Olof performs as DJ Coolof in nightclubs across Europe. He only performs at nights or at festivals with equal gender representation on the lineup of artists – no more than 50% people who identify as men.

In late 2009 and early 2010, Olof released four EPs under the pseudonym Oni Ayhun.

In late 2010, he released a remix of Emmanuel Jal's "Kuar". In 2011, he produced the song "Jam" by Planningtorock from the album W.

Upon being asked to DJ in Tel Aviv, Dreijer stated that he supports the international cultural boycott of Israel and the BDS movement in support of Palestinian rights. Dreijer and The Knife have supported this boycott for many years.

Releases
as Oni Ayhun:

as Olof Dreijer:

References

External links
 The Knife official website
 Oni Ayhun former website
 
 Resident Advisor DJ Page
 Discogs Profile

1981 births
Living people
Swedish male musicians
Male feminists
Swedish feminists
Feminist musicians
Swedish electronic musicians